AP-2 complex subunit sigma is a protein that in humans is encoded by the AP2S1 gene.

One of two major clathrin-associated adaptor complexes, AP-2, is a heterotetramer which is associated with the plasma membrane. This complex is composed of two large chains, a medium chain, and a small chain. This gene encodes the small chain of this complex. Alternative splicing has been observed in this gene and results in two known transcripts.

References

Further reading

External links